Aceuchal is a municipality located in the province of Badajoz, Extremadura, Spain. As of 2017 the municipality has a population of 5436 inhabitants.

References

External links

Municipalities in the Province of Badajoz